Graetz or Grätz is a German surname and place name and may refer to:

People
 Gidon Graetz (born 1929), Swiss-Israeli sculptor
 Bibi Graetz, owner and winemaker of Toscana wine producer Azienda Agricola Testamatta, son of Gidon 
 Heinrich Graetz (1817–1891), German Jewish historian
 Herbert Graetz (1893–1985), Australian Olympic rower
 Jean Graetz (1929-2020), American civil rights leader
 Joseph Graetz (1760–1826), German composer, organist, and educator
 Leo Graetz (1856–1941), German physicist, son of Heinrich
 Paul Graetz (1889–1937), German actor
 Robert Graetz (1928–2020), American Lutheran pastor and civil rights leader 
 Rudi Graetz (1907–1977), German esperantist
 Windisch-Graetz, princely family of the Holy Roman Empire

Places
 Grätz, the German name of Grodzisk Wielkopolski, Poland
 Grätz, the German name of Hradec nad Moravicí, Czech Republic
Kreis Grätz, one of several Kreise (counties) in the Prussian Province of Posen
 Windischgrätz, the German name of Slovenj Gradec, Slovenia

Other
 Graetz number, a dimensionless number that characterizes laminar flow in a conduit in fluid dynamics
 Graetz AG, German manufacturer of petrol lamps and radios

See also
Gratz (disambiguation)